Silacyclobutane is an organosilicon compound with the formula (CH2)3SiH2. It is a colourless volatile liquid of only academic interest.  More common derivatives include the disubstituted derivatives such as (CH2)3Si(CH3)2.  Being strained rings, such compounds exhibit enhanced reactivity.

References

Silanes
Four-membered rings
Silicon heterocycles